Kim Min-seok (born August 26, 1991) is a South Korean singer-songwriter. He is a member of South Korean duo MeloMance. His 2021 single "Drunken Confession", which was a remake of the 2005 single of the same name by South Korean singer Feel, spent five weeks at number one on South Korea's Gaon Digital Chart.

Philanthropy 
In January 2023, Kim donated  to the Social Welfare Community Chest of Love and participated in the 2023 Hope Sharing campaign with his younger brother Kim Woo-seok.

Discography

Extended plays

Singles

As lead artist

As featured artist

Soundtrack appearances

Filmography

Television show

Web shows

Awards and nominations

Notes

References

1991 births
Living people
South Korean male singers
Seoul Institute of the Arts alumni